The Pretoria Accord was a July 2002 agreement made between Rwanda and the Democratic Republic of the Congo (DRC) in an attempt to bring about an end to the Second Congo War. Rwanda agreed to the withdrawal of the estimated 20,000 Rwandan troops from the DRC in exchange for international commitment towards the disarmament of the Hutu militia interahamwe and ex-FAR fighters.

The talks were held in Pretoria, South Africa and lasted for five days.

See also
Timeline of Pretoria

References

External links
Full Text of Pretoria Accord

Peace treaties
Treaties of the Democratic Republic of the Congo
Treaties of Rwanda
Treaties concluded in 2002
Second Congo War
Democratic Republic of the Congo–Rwanda relations